The Moderate objectivism account of moral principles is based on the ethics of Sir William David Ross (1877–1940).  Moderate objectivism adheres to basic notions of the Natural Law Theory.  W. D. Ross refers to these moderate objectivists' accounts of moral principles as “prima facie principles” which are valid rules of action that one should generally adhere to but, in cases of moral conflict, may be overridable by another moral principle, hence the moderation.

Overview
Prima facie principles contain duties that are correlated with many ethical theories.  Such duties include fidelity, fulfilling commitments, truth and promises; justice, giving people what they deserve;  respect for freedom; beneficence, improving the conditions of others; non-injury; self-improvement, stemming from the possibility of improving one’s own condition with respect to virtue, intelligence, and happiness; non-parasitism, and most importantly reparation, the duty of making up for wrongful acts previously done to others.  Ross believed that these duties are to be followed and remain with each person's thought processes of behavior because it is their moral obligation to do so.  Also, prima facie principles prove the existence of ethical principles that are binding on rational beings.

Pojman, on the other hand created ten similar principles “necessary for the good life within a flourishing human community.”  He refers to these principles as the “core morality.”  These simple, common sense principles include such moral rules as:
do not kill innocent people,
do not cause unnecessary pain,
do not lie or deceive, cheat or steal,
honor your promises,
do not deprive another of his/her freedom,
show gratitude,
help others,
do justice, and
obey just laws.

Both prima facie and core morality are exceedingly similar unlike the ideas of objectivism and absolutism.  As said before, absolutists pursue the notion of “do the act that is set and given and do nothing else regardless of the situation.”  A good example of ethical absolutism is Kantian deontology.

The absolutist idea is one that is set in stone and there is no changing a single part or the whole theory would be paradoxical, conflicting with all the beliefs an absolutist has come to live by. A more moderate following would be the moderate objectivism because these objectivists are inclined to act according to the principle of benevolence.  Understandably, absolutists initially made the choice to follow these strict, concrete ways, but when it comes to something that involves acts of vindictiveness there is no way a being of reason could go through with such an act; it would be completely immoral according to a moderate objectivist.

References
Pojman, Louis P. Ethics: Discovering Right and Wrong, Belmont, California: Cambridge University Press, 2006.

Virtue ethics
Natural law